Castleward Opera  was a Northern Ireland opera company which staged an annual opera festival at Castle Ward, a National Trust house near Strangford in County Down. It was founded in 1985 by Ian Urwin and Jack Smith, with performances taking place in a converted stable on the grounds of the castle. Following the cut to its core funding by the Arts Council of Northern Ireland, the festival saw its final opera performances in June 2009 and in September 2010  held two gala farewell concerts of highlights from the company's 25-year history. In January 2010, a new venture, supported by the Arts Council of Northern Ireland, was proposed—Opera Company NI—which the Arts Council said would "incorporate the best resources from Castleward Opera and Opera Fringe".

Past productions
1985 – Così fan tutte
1986 – Don Giovanni and The Impresario
1987 – The Magic Flute and Dido and Aeneas
1988 – L'elisir d'amore and Trial by Jury
1989 – Pagliacci and Gianni Schicchi
1990 – Don Pasquale and Opera Scenes
1991 – Così fan tutte and Opera Scenes
1992 – La traviata and Gems from the Irish Ring
1993 – Lucia di Lammermoor and La belle Hélène
1994 – La Cenerentola and Orpheus in the Underworld
1995 – I Capuleti e i Montecchi and L'étoile
1996 – Ariadne auf Naxos and La bohème
1997 – Carmen and La bohème (revived for the Grand Opera House, Belfast)
1998 – La traviata and Carmen (revived for the Grand Opera House, Belfast)
1999 – The Barber of Seville, La Sonnambula, and La traviata (revived for the Grand Opera House, Belfast) 
2000 – Madame Butterfly, Martha, and The Barber of Seville (revived for the Grand Opera House, Belfast) 
2001 – The Marriage of Figaro, Madame Butterfly, and Martha (revived for the Grand Opera House, Belfast) 
2002 – Lucia di Lammermoor, La belle Hélène, and The Marriage of Figaro (revived for the Millennium Forum, Londonderry)
2003 – La rondine and Tosca
2004 – Albert Herring and Rigoletto
2005 – The Magic Flute and Carmen
2006 – La bohème and The Bohemian Girl
2007 – Un ballo in maschera
2008 – Così fan tutte
2009 – Die Fledermaus (also performed at Wexford Festival Opera)

See also
List of opera festivals
Country house opera
Country House Theatres

Notes and references

Sources
Arts Council of Northern Ireland, "New opera company for Northern Ireland", 26 January 2010
Couling, Della, "Castleward Opera, Northern Ireland", The Independent, 14 June 1995
Dervan, Michael, "North stages opera revamp", Irish Times, 8 February 2010 
Spackman, Conor, "The fat lady sings for Castle Ward opera", BBC News, 6 September 2010

External links
Official website

British opera companies
Music organisations based in Northern Ireland